Geringer is a surname. Notable people with the surname include:

 Alexander Geringer (born 1966), Austrian journalist, creative director, and magazine publisher
 Jim Geringer (born 1944), American politician